is a Japanese former swimmer. She competed at the 1968 Summer Olympics and the 1972 Summer Olympics.

References

External links
 

1948 births
Living people
Japanese female freestyle swimmers
Olympic swimmers of Japan
Swimmers at the 1968 Summer Olympics
Swimmers at the 1972 Summer Olympics
Sportspeople from Nara Prefecture
Asian Games medalists in swimming
Asian Games gold medalists for Japan
Asian Games silver medalists for Japan
Swimmers at the 1970 Asian Games
Medalists at the 1970 Asian Games
20th-century Japanese women